Clara María Ochoa is a Colombian film producer. She manages CMO Producciones, which promotes important Colombian films like Rosario Tijeras, Soñar no cuesta nada, Como el gato y el ratón (Like Cat and Mouse), Bolívar Soy Yo and Del amor y otros demonios (Of Love and Other Demons).

References

External links
 

Living people
Colombian film producers
Colombian women film producers
Year of birth missing (living people)